Cyriak Harris, known mononymously as Cyriak, his B3ta username Mutated Monty, and Mouldy in the Doom community is an English freelance animator, artist, composer, and author from Brighton. He is known for his surreal and bizarre short web animations with the frequent use of the Droste effect. Cyriak is his real birth name.

Animations 
Cyriak has been a regular contributor to the British website B3ta since 2004. His YouTube channel was launched in March 2006.

Cyriak's YouTube account features a compilation of his animations, which have been popular throughout the blogosphere and noted by Wired's Eliot Van Buskirk. Most of his videos are made with Adobe After Effects and FL Studio. Cyriak's animation "MOO" has featured on the front page of Wired. His 2009 video "poo pants" features an animated sample of broadcaster Alan Titchmarsh singing a repeated refrain (a pitch-shifted excerpt from children's music artist Ann Austin's "The Poo Song") from the bowls of a series of toilets, some of which fly through space.

As a freelance animator, he has been commissioned by the video sharing website Sumo TV, and a music video for Grand Popo Football Club, among others.

Cyriak made the "Spaceology" animation in the third episode of the fourth season of the TV series The IT Crowd and the "Goth to Boss" animation in the sixth episode. In 2015 he created the opening credits for the Netflix series W/ Bob & David.

Cyriak has directed a number of music videos, including videos for Bonobo's "Cirrus" and Bloc Party's "Ratchet" in 2013, Flying Lotus's "Putty Boy Strut" in 2014, Run the Jewels’s "Meowpurrdy" in 2016, and Sparks' "The Existential Threat" in 2020. His videos "Baaa" and "meow mix" have amassed more than 100 million views. Other popular uploads on his channel include "Welcome to Kitty City," "Cycles," and "7 billion."

Music and other activities
Long before Harris started creating animations, he composed a considerable amount of surreal music.

On 19 August 2008, Harris uploaded a music video of the song "My Territory" by Grand Popo Football Club. It features a landscape that has been made entirely out of a woman's body, and is a metaphor for consumerism and the treatment of the female body. On 9 September 2009, British illusionist Derren Brown, live on UK television, claimed to predict the National Lottery numbers. Cyriak uploaded a possible explanation, to his YouTube channel, which gained half a million views within a week and attention from national press.
In September 2010 he appeared at "Flash on the Beach" in Brighton and in September 2014 appeared at "Reasons to be Creative", also in Brighton.

On December 2013, he released the mod "Going Down" for the 1994 first-person shooter Doom II.

In March 2018, he started working on a partly crowd-funded book Horse Destroys the Universe. The book was published in September 2019. It is about scientists who experiment on a horse named Buttercup until they are given superhuman intelligence, until they eventually become an omnipotent being and destroy the universe.

On 8 February 2020, Cyriak showcased his music for the first time, as he performed as a disc jockey at the Zanzibar Club in Liverpool.

On August 2022, he released another Doom II mod titled "Overboard".

Awards and recognition
On 3 December 2009, Cyriak was announced as the winner of the 2009 E Stings competition, run by television channel E4, with £5,000 for his video Recursive Culture.

In 2006 he also received a special mention in the results of a Photoshop contest run by the technology series Click.

In 2012 and 2014 he was awarded with two Cacowards, an annual online awards ceremony which honours the year's most prominent modifications of Doom, being recognized for his outstanding level design and sophisticated technical approach to achieving complex sequences and impressive comedic timing.

In 2022 he was awarded with another Cacoward for his mod "Overboard", which was praised for its silliness and fast-paced gameplay.

McDonald's advertisement feud 
In 2016, Cyriak accused fast food chain McDonald's of plagiarizing his animated video "cows & cows & cows". The studio that animated the advertisement, Buenos Aires-based Juan Solo, openly admitted that they used Cyriak's work as "reference". After Cyriak's tweets about the theft went viral, the advert was pulled. The original video, featuring dancing cows, had received more than 67 million views.

Filmography

References

External links 
 Cyriak's website
 
 
 

British Internet celebrities
1974 births
English YouTubers
English animators
YouTube animators
Living people
Psychedelic artists
British surrealist artists
People from Brighton
Surreal comedy
YouTube channels launched in 2006